Graduated payments are repayment terms involving gradual increases in the payments on a closed-end obligation. A graduated payment loan typically involves negative amortization, and is intended for students in the case of student loans, and homebuyers in the case of real estate, who currently have moderate incomes and anticipate their income will increase over the next 5–10 years.

All Federal Housing Administration (FHA) lenders can offer a FHA Graduated payment mortgage loan, which begin with a lower monthly payment that increases annually over the first 5–10 years of the loan, and then it levels out to a fixed monthly payment for the remaining years of the mortgage. There are five FHA Graduated Payment Mortgages offered in 15-year and 30-year terms. The difference between the plans lies in the rate of increase of the mortgage payment, which annually increases 2.5%, 5%, or 7.5% until it levels off.

References

External links
 Dentist Mortgage Loans

Personal finance